Port Barrington (also referred to as Fox River Valley Gardens or FRG) is a village in Lake and McHenry counties in the U.S. state of Illinois. It was formerly known as Fox River Valley Gardens, but the name was changed in 2002 to Port Barrington. Per the 2020 census, the population was 1,584.

Name change

The village of Port Barrington was incorporated in 1969 under the name Fox River Valley Gardens. At the time, the village had the longest name out of all other incorporated places in Illinois, and was one of the longest town names in the country. For 33 years, Port Barrington shared a ZIP code (60010) with the village of Barrington,  to the south. In 2002, the village established its own post office and zip code. Homeowners in the new Riverwalk subdivision claimed that their home values fell significantly and immediately when their addresses were changed to "Fox River Valley Gardens". Some people trying to sell their homes at the time found themselves "underwater" (selling at a loss). This prompted residents in the Riverwalk section of the village to express their objection to what appeared to be a "bait and switch" in the change of mailing address. There were several tense village meetings where legal action was being considered by the new residents. In September 2002, the village board voted 4–3 in September 2002 to re-incorporate and change the community's name to "Port Barrington". However, several addresses in the older section of the village are still listed under the name Fox River Valley Gardens. In addition, many road signs and maps continue to use the community's original name, as do the local police and fire departments. As of 2019, the post office is no longer in service, and mail delivery is provided by the postal service in Island Lake, Illinois.

Geography
Port Barrington is located at  (42.243667, -88.198000).

Demographics

2020 census

2000 Census
As of the census of 2000, there were 788 people, 295 households, and 233 families residing in the village. The racial makeup of the village was 97.59% White, 0.51% African American, 1.02% Asian, 0.13% Pacific Islander, 0.25% from other races, and 0.51% from two or more races. Hispanic or Latino of any race were 2.79% of the population.

There were 295 households, out of which 38.3% had children under the age of 18 living with them, 70.2% were married couples living together, 4.4% had a female householder with no husband present, and 21.0% were non-families. 16.3% of all households were made up of individuals, and 4.7% had someone living alone who was 65 years of age or older. The average household size was 2.67 and the average family size was 2.99.

In the village, the population was spread out, with 26.8% under the age of 18, 3.3% from 18 to 24, 43.3% from 25 to 44, 20.3% from 45 to 64, and 6.3% who were 65 years of age or older. The median age was 41.6 years. For every 100 females, there were 96.5 males. For every 100 females age 18 and over, there were 94.9 males.

The median income for a household in the village was $114,750.  The median property value in the village was $283,300.

Lifestyle
The village is a very active community.  Winter has people snowmobiling, cross country skiing, ice fishing and ice skating on village trails and lakes. In the summer, cyclists, runners, fishermen and boaters come from all over the area to this town. The Broken Oar and the Lake County Marina are the two largest attractions.

Halloween tradition is to have children trick or treat on the Sunday before Halloween during the mid-day (11am to 3pm). This increases safety for kids and allows the adults to share a beverage and talk.  It is a very fun tradition enjoyed by many.  The McHenry County Sheriff has been a great supporter and monitor of the days events.  At Christmas, the Santa parade rides through town with an escort of fire engines, McHenry County Sheriff and car loads of people throwing candy to kids waving from their homes and yards.

References

External links
 

Chicago metropolitan area
Villages in Lake County, Illinois
Villages in McHenry County, Illinois
Villages in Illinois
Populated places established in 2002
2002 establishments in Illinois